The Women's super-G competition at the FIS Alpine World Ski Championships 2023 was held at Roc de Fer ski course in Méribel on 8 February 2023.

Results

References

Women's super-G